The British decimal ten pence coin (often shortened to 10p in writing and speech) is a denomination of sterling coinage worth  of a pound. Its obverse has featured the profile of Queen Elizabeth II since the coin's introduction in 1968, to replace the florin (two shilling) coin in preparation for decimalisation in 1971. It remained the same size as the florin coin (which also remained legal tender) until a smaller version was introduced 30 September 1992, with the older coins being withdrawn on 30 June 1993. Four different portraits of the Queen have been used on the coin; the latest design by Jody Clark was introduced in 2015. The second and current reverse, featuring a segment of the Royal Shield, was introduced in 2008.

The ten pence coin was originally minted from cupro-nickel (75% Cu, 25% Ni), but since 2012 it has been minted in nickel-plated steel due to the increasing price of metal. From January 2013 the Royal Mint began a programme to gradually remove the previous cupro-nickel coins from circulation and replace them with the nickel-plated steel versions.

 there were an estimated 1,631 million 10p coins in circulation, with an estimated face value of £163.08 million.

10p coins are legal tender for amounts up to the sum of £5 when offered in repayment of a debt; however, the coin's legal tender status is not normally relevant for everyday transactions.

Design

Obverse
To date, four different obverses have been used. In the original design both sides of the coin are encircled by dots, a common feature on coins, known as beading.

As with all new decimal currency, until 1984 the portrait of Queen Elizabeth II by Arnold Machin appeared on the obverse, in which the Queen wears the 'Girls of Great Britain and Ireland' Tiara.

Between 1985 and 1997 the portrait by Raphael Maklouf was used, in which the Queen wears the George IV State Diadem.

On 30 September 1992 a reduced-size version of the 10 pence coin was introduced. The older and larger version of the coin was withdrawn from circulation on 30 June 1993. The design remained unchanged.

As of June 2015, coins bearing the portrait by Jody Clark have been seen in circulation.

Reverse

Original Reverse Design 
The original reverse of the coin, designed by Christopher Ironside, and used from 1968 to 2008, is a crowned lion (formally, Part of the crest of England, a lion passant guardant royally crowned), with the numeral "10" below the lion, and either NEW PENCE (1968–1981) or TEN PENCE (1982–2008) above the lion.

Royal Shield Design 
In August 2005 the Royal Mint launched a competition to find new reverse designs for all circulating coins apart from the £2 coin. The winner, announced in April 2008, was Matthew Dent, whose designs were gradually introduced into the circulating British coinage from mid-2008. The designs for the 1p, 2p, 5p, 10p, 20p and 50p coins depict sections of the Royal Shield that form the whole shield when placed together. The shield in its entirety was featured on the now-obsolete round £1 coin. The 10p coin depicts part of the first quarter of the shield, showing two of the lions passant from the Royal Banner of England, with the words TEN PENCE above the shield design. The coin's obverse remains largely unchanged, but the beading (the ring of dots around the coin's circumference), which no longer features on the coin's reverse, has also been removed from the obverse.

A to Z Design (Great British Coin Hunt) 
In March 2018, new designs were released, one for each of the 26 letters of the alphabet. Anne Jessopp, chief executive of the Royal Mint, described the designs as "iconic themes that are quintessentially British". The A to Z coins were confirmed to have individual mintage figures of 220,000 on 14 October 2019 - a total of 5,720,000 for all 26.
A – Angel of the North
B – Bond... James Bond
C – Cricket
D – Double-decker bus
E – English breakfast
F – Fish and chips
G – Greenwich Mean Time
H – Houses of Parliament
I – Ice cream
J – Jubilee
K – King Arthur
L – Loch Ness Monster
M – Mackintosh
N – NHS
O – Oak tree
P – Post box
Q – Queuing
R – Robin
S – Stonehenge
T – Tea
U – Union Flag
V – Village
W – World Wide Web
X – X marks the spot
Y – Yeoman Warder
Z – Zebra crossing

Status as legal tender 
10p coins are legal tender for amounts up to and including £5. However, in the UK, "legal tender" has a very specific and narrow meaning which relates only to the repayment of debt to a creditor, not to everyday shopping or other transactions. Specifically, coins of particular denominations are said to be "legal tender" when a creditor must by law accept them in redemption of a debt. The term does not mean - as is often thought - that a shopkeeper has to accept a particular type of currency in payment. A shopkeeper is under no obligation to accept any specific type of payment, whether legal tender or not; conversely they have the discretion to accept any payment type they wish.

Mintages
Mintage figures below represent the number of coins of each date released for circulation. Mint Sets have been produced since 1982; where mintages on or after that date indicate 'none', there are examples contained within those sets.
 Machin portrait

Maklouf portrait

 Rank-Broadley portrait

 Jody Clark portrait

References

External links 

Royal Mint – 10p coin
Coins of the UK – Decimal 10p Coin
Ten Pence, Coin Type from United Kingdom

Coins of the United Kingdom
Currencies introduced in 1968
Ten-cent coins